Pyramidobela ochrolepra is a moth in the family Oecophoridae. It is found in Mexico.

The ground color of the forewings is brownish white. The costal and dorsal areas are faintly suffused with darker brown, leaving an ill-defined, whitish clouding longitudinally through the middle of the wing. The ground color of the hindwings is pale gray.

References

Moths described in 1973
Oecophoridae